The Figure Skating Federation of Russia (lit. Figure Skating on Skates Federation of Russia) is the national sport governing body for figure skating in Russia. It is recognized as such by the Russian Olympic Committee (ROC) and the International Skating Union (ISU). No individual membership exists, and its members are part of various regional ice sports associations. It was founded in 1992 as the successor of the Figure Skating Federation of the USSR (Soviet Union).

The goals of this governing body are: taking a plan of competitions by the calendar, developing a curriculum for figure skating in Russia, forming a national team, making contracts with sportsmen and coaches, international relations with other skating organizations, assistance to regional federations, organizing the Rostelecom Cup (formerly the Cup of Russia) and other important events. Since 2009, the main sponsor of the federation is Rostelecom.

After the 2022 Russian invasion of Ukraine, the ISU suspended the participation of athletes from Russia in international events until further notice.

Structure 
The Russian Figure Skating Federation was headed until 2010 by its long-time president Valentin Piseev, who had also been the president of the Soviet Figure Skating Federation since 1989 until its dissolution in 1991. However, when he refused to nominate himself at the 2010 presidential election, Aleksandr Gorshkov, formerly a vice-president, was elected a new president on June 4, 2010, with Piseev becoming a general director. Anton Sikharulidze, who also registered as a presidential candidate, withdrew due to the changes in the Federation's constitution. Sikharulidze commented that "presidential powers are limited to representative functions" and the whole post turned nominal, so the real leadership belongs to general director, including the ability to sign financial documents and making sole decisions. Sikharulidze added he does not "want to become a president just to carry the general director's briefcase". Tatiana Tarasova, Piseev's usual opponent, approved the decision of making him the general director, stating that "not using his knowledge and international authority would be very wrong". Since September 2014, the general director is Alexander Kogan.

Apart from the president, there are several vice presidents. As of 2006, the list of vice presidents included international judge Sergei Kononykhin, Aleksandr Lakernik, Oleg Nilov and Irina Raber. Irina Raber and Oleg Nilov head the largest regional federations, in Moscow and St. Petersburg. In 2010, Alexander Kogan was also elected as vice president.

The governing of the Figure Skating Federation of Russia is fulfilled by a conference that is held once in two years. All decisions during the conference are made through voting. Members who participate are chosen by regional figure skating federations. In intervals between conferences, the Federation is ruled by a presidium of 30 people.

Regional federations
The Figure Skating Federation of Russia is composed of 36 regional federations.

Competitions 
 Annual Russian Championships
 Rostelecom Cup
 Russian Junior Championships
 Russian Cup (national championship selections)
 Belgorod Oblast Open Championships with A. Mishin prizes (in Belgorod)
 Nikolai Panin Memorial (St. Petersburg)
 Northern Lights (Arkhangelsk)
 Samarochka (Samara)
 Silver Skates (Tomsk)
 Zhuk Memorial
 Siberia and the Far East Open Championships

References

External links
  

Russia
Figure skating
Organizations based in Moscow
Sport in Moscow
Figure skating in Russia
1992 in Russian sport
1992 in figure skating
Sports organizations established in 1992
National governing bodies for figure skating